Gilles de Caux de Montlebert, (c.1682, Ligneries, near Argentan – 17 September 1733, Bayeux) was an 18th-century French poet and playwright from Normandy.

A descendant of Pierre Corneille by his mother, he was controller of the king's farms. He served as nominees to président Hénault for the publication in 1716 of his tragedy Marius à Cirthe, to which he probably worked. His tragedy Lysimachus, completed by his son, was presented without success in 1737.

Boileau praised one of his poems entitled L'Horloge de sable. He collaborated with L'Année littéraire by Fréron.

Works 
1714: L'Horloge de sable, figure du monde, moral poem
1715: Marius à Cirthe, tragedy, avec le président Hénault, premiered 15 November 1715 (published in 1716)
1725: Ode au roi et à la reine sur leur mariage
1737: Lysimachus, tragedy, premiered 13 December 1737 (published in 1738)
 Adraste, tragedy (non printed)

External links 
 Gilles de Caux de Montlebert on Data.bnf.fr
 Gilles de Caux de Montlebert on CÉSAR

,

18th-century French male writers
18th-century French poets
18th-century French dramatists and playwrights
Writers from Normandy
1682 births
1733 deaths